National University "Odesa Maritime Academy" is a maritime university in Odesa, Ukraine. Currently, the main task of the university is to ensure the competitiveness of graduates in the Ukrainian and world labor markets, by training seafarers while taking into account the most demanding claims of leading shipowners.

Since Ukrainian independence, the university opened new specialties and created a network of separate structural units, in particular in the cities of Mariupol and Izmail . The staff is working to improve the organization and content of the educational process. NU "OMA" has a modern material and technical base, with modern naval simulators, a large library, and a unique training and sailing vessel called "Druzhba". The university also has the conditions for physical culture and sports: an Olympic-class swimming pool, a sports gym, sports sections and a water station at the disposal of cadets and students.

History 
The Odesa Higher Maritime School was established on June 7th, 1944. It was renamed the Odesa Higher Naval Engineering School in 1958 and Odesa State Maritime Academy in 1991, following Ukrainian independence. It became a national university and assumed Odesa National Maritime Academy in 2002 before finally assuming its current name in 2016.

Notable alumni
Anatoli Khorozov — president of the Ice Hockey Federation of Ukraine.

See also
List of maritime colleges

References
Official site

Maritime colleges
Universities and colleges in Odesa
Buildings and structures in Odesa
1944 establishments in Ukraine
Educational institutions established in 1944
Universities and institutes established in the Soviet Union
National universities in Ukraine
Naval academies